The men's 10,000 metres at the 1971 European Athletics Championships was held in Helsinki, Finland, at Helsinki Olympic Stadium on 10 August 1971.

Medalists

Results

Final
10 August

Participation
According to an unofficial count, 35 athletes from 18 countries participated in the event.

 (2)
 (1)
 (3)
 (3)
 (3)
 (2)
 (1)
 (1)
 (1)
 (2)
 (2)
 (1)
 (2)
 (1)
 (2)
 (3)
 (3)
 (2)

References

10000 metres
10,000 metres at the European Athletics Championships
Marathons in Finland